South Grand Prairie High School (SGPHS) is a public high school in the city of Grand Prairie, Texas, United States. It is part of the 36-campus Grand Prairie Independent School District.

History
South Grand Prairie High School originally opened in the fall of 1969 with 448 students enrolled, 87 of which were seniors. The first campus was housed at what is now the Dr. Vern Alexander building. 

In 1972 the current campus was opened and the Vocational School was built. 

In 1982, The building was expanded including the new Keel Theatre and 58 more classrooms were added. 

In 1990, The building was expanded again including New Football Locker room, 22 more classrooms, a Discipline Office, Gymnasium Addition, and a Teachers Lounge. 
  
In 1999, South Grand Prairie was named a "New American High School National Showcase Site" by the U. S. Department of Education.

In 2002, the front of the building was completely redesigned, and the SGPHS 9th Grade Campus was moved to an adjacent building (formerly Andrew Jackson Middle School) to the main campus. Since that time, many career academy courses have been implemented and acknowledged.

In 2001-2002 and 2002-2003 the school received a "Recognized" status from the Texas Education Agency.

In the spring of 2007, SGP received a grant to become part of the SREB and the HSTW new Enhanced Schools Network. Over a two-year period, the administration and staff will work toward even more improvement via the 'best practices' recommended by this program. Specifically included is a concentrated literacy emphasis, which at SGP is referred to as the WRAD program - Writing and Reading across Disciplines.

In the beginning of the 2012-2013 school year, The Coliseum Gym and the basement was renovated and the Vocational School was converted to a Fine Arts building.

In 2017, The 9th Grade Center was renamed the Dr. Vern Alexander Building.

In late 2018, a new administration building was added, and the existing administration offices was now converted to a teachers' conference room.

Feeder schools 
The following elementary schools feed into South Grand Prairie High School:

 Barbara Bush Elementary School
 Colin Powell Elementary School
 Ellen Ochoa Stem Academy (partial)
 Ervin Whitt Elementary School
 Florence Hill Elementary School
 Garner Fine Arts Academy
 Mike Moseley Elementary School
 Sallye Moore Elementary School (partial)
 Sam Rayburn Elementary School (partial)
 Suzanna Dickinson Elementary School
 Thurgood Marshall Leadership Acade

The following middle schools feed into South Grand Prairie High School:

 Andrew Jackson Middle School
 Bill Arnold Middle School (partial)
 Harry Truman Middle School
 John Kennedy Middle School (partial)
 Ronald Reagan Middle School

Notable alumni
Robert Hart, 1994 Pulitzer Prize winner. Mr. Hart graduated from South Grand Prairie in 1971. Thereafter, he graduated with a B.S degree in Journalism and Communications from the University of Texas at Arlington. He is the former director of online content at the Belo Corp.. In 1994, he won the Pulitzer Prize in International Reporting for his work on "The Dallas Morning News" team project, "Violence Against Women." He also is a former member of the journalism faculties at Southern Methodist University and Texas Christian University.
Remi Ayodele, professional football player
Reggie Barnes, professional football player
Skeeter Henry, professional basketball player
Netz Katz, IBM Professor of Mathematics at the California Institute of Technology.
Jennifer McFalls, Olympic softball gold medalist in 2000
Jeff Okudah, professional football player for the Detroit Lions
Roy Robertson-Harris, Professional Football player.
Jason Villalba, member of the Texas House of Representatives from District 114 in Dallas County; attorney for Dallas firm of Haynes and Boone
Jonathan Villanueva, professional soccer player
Carson Wiggs, professional football player

References

External links
 Official site

Grand Prairie Independent School District high schools
Educational institutions established in 1969
Buildings and structures in Grand Prairie, Texas
1969 establishments in Texas